Édouard Persin (born 29 March 1902, date of death unknown) was a French racing cyclist. He finished in last place in the 1928 Tour de France.

References

External links

1902 births
Year of death missing
French male cyclists
Place of birth missing